The Amga (Amma) is a river in Sakha (Yakutia), Russia. The Amga freezes up in the first half of October and stays under the ice until May. Many different kinds of Fish can be found in the Amga river.

Course
The river has its source in the Aldan Highlands. It forms the eastern limit of the Lena Plateau. It is the biggest tributary of the Aldan, which it joins on the left bank a few miles west of Khandyga.

See also
List of rivers of Russia

References

External links

Rivers of the Sakha Republic
Central Yakutian Lowland